Richard Jackman (born June 28, 1978) is a Canadian former professional ice hockey defenceman who played in the National Hockey League (NHL). Jackman was born in Toronto, Ontario.

Playing career

Junior
Jackman played junior hockey for the Sault Ste. Marie Greyhounds of the Ontario Hockey League (OHL) from 1996 to 1998. He played alongside future Hart Trophy and Art Ross Trophy winner Joe Thornton.

Professional
Jackman was drafted fifth overall by the Dallas Stars in the 1996 NHL Entry Draft. Jackman has played 231 career NHL games, scoring 19 goals and 58 assists for 77 points. His best offensive season was with the Pittsburgh Penguins in 2003–04, after coming over from the Toronto Maple Leafs; he scored 7 goals and 24 points in 25 games. He was traded by the Leafs for veteran defenceman Drake Berehowsky at the trade deadline.

During the 2004–05 NHL lockout, Jackman played for Björklöven in the Swedish Allsvenskan.

Returning to the Penguins in 2005–06, Jackman's blistering slapshot contributed to 6 goals and 22 assists, but did not stop him from being frequently benched. At the trade deadline in 2006, Jackman was traded to the Florida Panthers for Petr Tatíček and draft picks.

Jackman was traded from the Florida Panthers to the Anaheim Ducks on January 3, 2007, for a conditional pick in the 2007 NHL Entry Draft. He won the Stanley Cup in 2007 with the Anaheim Ducks.

After parts of five seasons in the NHL, Jackman opted to sign overseas with EC Red Bull Salzburg in Austria in the summer of 2007. He also played for Leksand of Allsvenskan in Sweden and Biel of the Swiss-A league. In 2010, he accepted a special invitation to play for the Utah Grizzlies (ECHL) prior to joining HC Slovan Bratislava in Slovak Extraliga. On December 5, 2010, Jackman signed a 2-year deal with HC Slovan Bratislava, but since the club is struggling financially, Jackman asked to waive the contract. On July 17, 2011, Jackman officially signed with Anyang Halla of ALH for a 3-year-deal.

After two seasons, the club released Jackman due to an undisclosed reason. He then played for a year for Székesfehérvár, a Hungarian team playing in the Austrian Erste Bank Eishockey Liga.

On August 26, 2014, the Nippon Paper Cranes, a Japanese team playing in the Asia League Ice Hockey, announced that they had signed Jackman to a one-year contract.

On June 11, 2015, the Braehead Clan of the UK EIHL announced that they had signed the former Stanley Cup winner for the 2015-16 Season.

For the 2016-17 season, Jackman remained in the UK by signing for Braehead's Elite League rivals, the Fife Flyers. After a season in Fife, Jackman confirmed his intention to retire in April 2017.

International play
Internationally, Jackman has represented Team Canada. He helped Canada capture a gold medal at the 1997 World Junior Championships. Jackman also won the 2007 Spengler Cup as a member of Team Canada. He also played in 2008 & 2009 for Team Canada in the Spengler Cup.

Coaching career
In June 2017, Jackman was appointed head coach of the Bradford Rattlers of the Greater Metro Junior A Hockey League. The team amassed a record of 31–11–0; tying for first in the Northern Conference.

Career statistics

Regular season and playoffs

International

Awards and honours

References

External links

1978 births
Fehérvár AV19 players
Anaheim Ducks players
HL Anyang players
Braehead Clan players
Boston Bruins players
Canadian expatriate ice hockey players in Japan
Canadian expatriate ice hockey players in Scotland
Canadian expatriate ice hockey players in Austria
Canadian expatriate ice hockey players in Slovakia
Canadian expatriate ice hockey players in Hungary
Canadian expatriate ice hockey players in Sweden
Canadian expatriate ice hockey players in the United States
Canadian ice hockey defencemen
Dallas Stars draft picks
Dallas Stars players
EC Red Bull Salzburg players
Fife Flyers players
Florida Panthers players
HC Slovan Bratislava players
IF Björklöven players
Kalamazoo Wings (1974–2000) players
Leksands IF players
Living people
National Hockey League first-round draft picks
Nippon Paper Cranes players
Pittsburgh Penguins players
Ice hockey people from Toronto
Sault Ste. Marie Greyhounds players
St. John's Maple Leafs players
Stanley Cup champions
Toronto Maple Leafs players
Utah Grizzlies (IHL) players
Utah Grizzlies (ECHL) players
Canadian expatriate ice hockey players in South Korea